Jacobaea trapezuntina, the Trapezuntian groundsel, is a herbaceous plant, a member of the family Asteraceae.

Distribution
It is an native species to Turkey.

Taxonomy
It was named by Bertil Nordenstam, in Willdenowia 37: 181, in 2007.

References

External links

trapezuntina